Greek Hits: Giorgos Mazonakis vs. Despina Vandi is the fifth video album by Greek singer Despina Vandi and her only video album in Ukraine, released in 2008 by Odyssey Company in Ukraine. It features videos of Despina Vandi and Giorgos Mazonakis, from the period 2003-2007.

Track listing

References

External links
 Official site

Despina Vandi video albums
Greek-language albums
Music videos directed by Kostas Kapetanidis
2008 video albums
2008 compilation albums
Music video compilation albums